Bathygadus nipponicus is a species of rattail. This is a deep-water fish found in the waters around southern Japan and northern Taiwan.

This species grows to around 57 cm          (22.4 in) in length. It has a fairly wide mouth with a low, broad snout, large eyes and no chin barbel. The mouth is terminal with very small, conical teeth.

References 

A new species, Caelorinchus sheni, and 19 new records of grenadiers (Pisces: Gadiformes: Macrouridae) from Taiwan - CHIOU Mei-Luen ; SHAO Kwang-Tsao ; IWAMOTO Tomio

Macrouridae
Taxa named by David Starr Jordan
Taxa named by Charles Henry Gilbert
Fish described in 1904
Fish of Japan
Fish of Taiwan
Marine fish of Asia